Osmar dos Santos Filho, commonly known as Mazinho (born 25 December 1988) is a Brazilian professional footballer who last played for Caldense in the Campeonato Mineiro.

Playing career
Mazinho transferred from Juventus SC to América Mineiro in March 2013.

In late 2018, Mazinho joined Caldense in the Campeonato Mineiro. He played two times in the 2019 Campeonato Mineiro.

Career statistics

References 

Brazilian footballers

Living people
Expatriate footballers in Indonesia
1988 births
Association football midfielders
Esporte Clube Novo Hamburgo players
Brusque Futebol Clube players
Tombense Futebol Clube players
Clube Atlético Metropolitano players
Perseru Serui players
Botafogo Futebol Clube (PB) players